Route 420 is a  long mostly east–west secondary highway in the northwest portion of New Brunswick, Canada.

The route's Eastern terminus starts on Route 108 between the community of McGraw Brook and Flat Landing. The road travels north before turning north-easterly following the South Bank of the Southwest Miramichi River through the mostly treed area to the community of Harris Brook Settlement.  The road continues north east to the community of Matthews then passing by the community of Lyttleton.

The road continues north east passing Gibbons Island to the community of Sillikers.  Continuing the road passes Johnsons Island, Mitchells Island, Indian Island then Little Indian Island before coming to the intersection of Route 425 near Sunny Corner.  The road continues to follow the Southwest Miramichi River through the Metepenagiag Mi'kmaq Nation through  the Reserve of Red Bank passing the northern exit of Route 415, passing the community of Cassilis passing Shillelagh Cove, the community of South Esk before ending at the community of Derby Junction in Miramichi intersection at Route 8 and Route 108.

History

Intersecting routes
Route 8
Route 108
Route 425
Route 415

See also

References

420
420